Caia , pronounced "ch-AYE-ah", is a collaborative effort of electronica artists Maiku Takahashi and Andy Cato of Groove Armada and The Weekend Players. Their only known album, The Magic Dragon, was released in April 2003.

The first track on the album, The Rose Room's drum beat has a bass-rich sound and synth, with ambient voices and a calming sound. Remembrance is a 7-minute-long instrumental that has light electric piano sounds and a dreamy synth, with ambient voices calling out from the background. Following that is The Love Room, which has a sound similar to that of The Rose Room with its bass rich drum beat, but has a bit of a darker, minor sound compared to the light, major chords ever-present in The Rose Room and Remembrance. The fourth track, Summer Lightning, is aptly named, for its dreamy bongo-esque drum beat and light dreamy instrumental noise about it. La Telecabine has a light sound that escalates to a pounding drum beat with dreamy instrumentals, and calming down as the song ends and transfers to Mr. Gone. Heavy Weather and Subway Freedom share the same vibe of an African-sounding bongo drum and a light instrumental tone that swiftly transitions to a louder, richer, and bass-enhanced sound, then calms down similar to Remembrance and Summer Lightning. Finally, Afterwards @ The Bar has a very calm, instrumental noise that ends the short-lived group's only album like it's falling into a deep sleep.

The song The Rose Room from their debut album was used in the CSI Miami season one episode Tinder Box.

Track List

Japanese electronic music groups